Leucos ylikiensis is a species of freshwater fish in the family Cyprinidae. It is found only in Greece, in the Kifissos drainage and Lake Yliki. The other known population, in Lake Paralimni, was extirpated when the lake was drained. L. ylikiensis was  described as a distinct species in 1991. It is threatened by habitat loss.

References

Endemic fauna of Greece
Freshwater fish of Europe
Leucos
Fish described in 1991